Maraging steels (a portmanteau of "martensitic" and "aging") are steels that are known for possessing superior strength and toughness without losing ductility. Aging refers to the extended heat-treatment process. These steels are a special class of very-low-carbon ultra-high-strength steels that derive their strength not from carbon, but from precipitation of intermetallic compounds. The principal alloying element is 15 to 25 wt% nickel. Secondary alloying elements, which include cobalt, molybdenum and titanium, are added to produce intermetallic precipitates. Original development (by Bieber of Inco in the late 1950s) was carried out on 20 and 25 wt% Ni steels to which small additions of aluminium, titanium, and niobium were made; a rise in the price of cobalt in the late 1970s led to the development of cobalt-free maraging steels.

The common, non-stainless grades contain 17–19 wt% nickel, 8–12 wt% cobalt, 3–5 wt% molybdenum and 0.2–1.6 wt% titanium. Addition of chromium produces stainless grades resistant to corrosion. This also indirectly increases hardenability as they require less nickel; high-chromium, high-nickel steels are generally austenitic and unable to transform to martensite when heat treated, while lower-nickel steels can transform to martensite. Alternative variants of nickel-reduced maraging steels are based on alloys of iron and manganese plus minor additions of aluminium, nickel and titanium where compositions between Fe-9wt% Mn to Fe-15wt% Mn have been used. The manganese has a similar effect as nickel, i.e. it stabilizes the austenite phase. Hence, depending on their manganese content, Fe-Mn maraging steels can be fully martensitic after quenching them from the high temperature austenite phase or they can contain retained austenite. The latter effect enables the design of maraging-TRIP steels where TRIP stands for Transformation-Induced-Plasticity.

Properties
Due to the low carbon content (less than 0.03%) maraging steels have good machinability. Prior to aging, they may also be cold rolled to as much as 90% without cracking. Maraging steels offer good weldability, but must be aged afterward to restore the original properties to the heat affected zone.

When heat-treated the alloy has very little dimensional change, so it is often machined to its final dimensions. Due to the high alloy content maraging steels have a high hardenability. Since ductile FeNi martensites are formed upon cooling, cracks are non-existent or negligible. The steels can be nitrided to increase case hardness and polished to a fine surface finish.

Non-stainless varieties of maraging steel are moderately corrosion-resistant and resist stress corrosion and hydrogen embrittlement. Corrosion-resistance can be increased by cadmium plating or phosphating.

Grades of maraging steel

Maraging steels are usually described by a number (e.g., SAE steel grades 200, 250, 300 or 350), which indicates the approximate nominal tensile strength in thousands of pounds per square inch (ksi); the compositions and required properties are defined in US military standard MIL-S-46850D. The higher grades have more cobalt and titanium in the alloy; the compositions below are taken from table 1 of MIL-S-46850D:

That family is known as the 18Ni maraging steels, from its nickel percentage.  There is also a family of cobalt-free maraging steels which are cheaper but not quite as strong; one example is Fe-18.9Ni-4.1Mo-1.9Ti. There has been Russian and Japanese research in Fe-Ni-Mn maraging alloys.

Heat treatment cycle
This is followed by air cooling or quenching to room temperature to form a soft, heavily dislocated iron-nickel lath (untwinned) martensite. Subsequent aging (precipitation hardening) of the more common alloys for approximately 3 hours at a temperature of  produces a fine dispersion of Ni3(X,Y) intermetallic phases along dislocations left by martensitic transformation, where X and Y are solute elements added for such precipitation. Overaging leads to a reduction in stability of the primary, metastable, coherent precipitates, leading to their dissolution and replacement with semi-coherent Laves phases such as Fe2Ni/Fe2Mo. Further excessive heat-treatment brings about the decomposition of the martensite and reversion to austenite.

Newer compositions of maraging steels have revealed other intermetallic stoichiometries and crystallographic relationships with the parent martensite, including rhombohedral and massive complex Ni50(X,Y,Z)50 (Ni50M50 in simplified notation).

Uses
Maraging steel's strength and malleability in the pre-aged stage allows it to be formed into thinner rocket and missile skins than other steels, reducing weight for a given strength. Maraging steels have very stable properties and, even after overaging due to excessive temperature, only soften slightly. They are suitable for engine components, such as crankshafts and gears, and the firing pins of automatic weapons that cycle from hot to cool repeatedly while under substantial load. Their uniform expansion and easy machinability before aging make maraging steel useful in high-wear components of assembly lines and dies. Other ultra-high-strength steels, such as AerMet alloys, are not as machinable because of their carbide content.

In the sport of fencing, blades used in competitions run under the auspices of the Fédération Internationale d'Escrime are usually made with maraging steel. Maraging blades are superior for foil and épée because crack propagation in maraging steel is 10 times slower than in carbon steel, resulting in less frequent breaking of the blade and fewer injuries. Stainless maraging steel is used in bicycle frames (e.g. Reynolds 953 introduced in 2013) and golf club heads. It is also used in surgical components and hypodermic syringes, but is not suitable for scalpel blades because the lack of carbon prevents it from holding a good cutting edge.

American musical instrument string producer Ernie Ball has made a specialist type of electric guitar string out of maraging steel, claiming that this alloy provides more output and enhanced tonal response.

The production, import, and export of maraging steels by certain entities, such as the United States, is closely monitored by international authorities because it is particularly suited for use in gas centrifuges for uranium enrichment; lack of maraging steel significantly hampers the uranium-enrichment process.  Older centrifuges used aluminum tubes, while modern ones use carbon fiber composite.

Physical properties
 Density: 8.1 g/cm3 (0.29 lb/in3)
 Specific heat, mean for 0–100 °C (32–212 °F): 452 J/kg·K (0.108 Btu/lb·°F)
 Melting point: 
 Thermal conductivity: 25.5 W/m·K
 Mean coefficient of thermal expansion: 11.3×10−6 K−1 (20.3×10−6 °F−1)
 Yield tensile strength: typically 
 Ultimate tensile strength: typically . Grades exist up to 
 Elongation at break: up to 15%
 KIC fracture toughness: up to 175 MPa·m
 Young's modulus: 
 Shear modulus: 
 Bulk modulus: 
 Hardness (aged): 50 HRC (grade 250); 54 HRC (grade 300); 58 HRC (grade 350)

See also
 Aermet
 USAF-96 and Eglin steel (Inexpensive maraging steels with less nickel and other expensive materials.)

References

External links
Maraging steel data sheets 

Steels